United Nations Security Council Resolution 535, adopted unanimously on June 29, 1983, after examining the report of the Mission to Lesotho commissioned in Resolution 527 (1982), the Council reaffirmed its opposition to apartheid, commending Lesotho for providing sanctuary to refugees from South Africa.

The Council urged Member States and international organisations to provide assistance to Lesotho, requesting the Secretary-General to keep the Council regularly informed on the situation in the region.

See also
 List of United Nations Security Council Resolutions 501 to 600 (1982–1987)
 South African Border War
 South Africa under apartheid

References
Text of the Resolution at undocs.org

External links
 

 0535
 0535
 0535
1983 in South Africa
June 1983 events
Lesotho–South Africa relations